Cuspidothrix is a genus of cyanobacteria belonging to the family Nostocaceae.

The genus has almost cosmopolitan distribution.

Species:

Cuspidothrix elenkinii 
Cuspidothrix issatschenkoi 
Cuspidothrix tropicalis

References

Nostocaceae
Cyanobacteria genera